Stephanuskirche (Evangelical Lutheran Church of St. Stephen) also known as Detmerode Church is a church and parish center in Wolfsburg, Germany designed by Finnish architect Alvar Aalto in 1963. Completed in 1968, the building is a prominent example of International modernism in Germany.

The church contains 250 seats and can be configured to hold a capacity of 600 when needed.

Gallery

See also 
 Church of the Holy Spirit, Wolfsburg
 Alvar Aalto Cultural Centre

References 

Alvar Aalto buildings
Alvar Aalto churches
Buildings and structures in Wolfsburg